The 1980 McNeese State Cowboys football team was an American football team that represented McNeese State University as a member of the Southland Conference during the 1980 NCAA Division I-A football season. In its second season under head coach Ernie Duplechin, the team compiled an overall record of 10–2 record with a mark of 5–0 against conference opponents, won the Southland championship, and outscored opponents by a total of 318 to 154. The team played its home games in Cowboy Stadium in Lake Charles, Louisiana.

The team concluded an undefeated season against SLC opponents and clinched the conference championship with a 14–0 shutout victory over Southwestern Louisiana on November 22, 1980.

After winning the conference championship, McNeese was invited to play in the 1980 Independence Bowl, losing to Southern Miss by a 16–14 score. McNeese led by a 14–10 score late in the fourth quarter after Southern Miss recovered a fumble at the McNeese seven-yard line. McNeese kicker Don Stump also missed field goal attempts of 37 and 42 yards.

The team's statistical leaders included sophomore quarterback Stephen Starring with 1,006 passing yards and 1,980 yards of total offense, Theron McClendon with 1,272 rushing yards, Mark Barousse with 308 receiving yards, and placekicker Don Stump with 62 points scored. Starring went on to play seven seasons, principally as a wide receiver, in the National Football League. He was inducted into the McNeese State University Hall of Fame in 2000.

Schedule

References

McNeese State
McNeese Cowboys football seasons
Southland Conference football champion seasons
McNeese State Cowboys football